The first USS Orca (SP-726) was a yacht that served in the United States Navy as a patrol vessel from 1917 to 1918.
 
Orca was built as the steam yacht Monaloa by George Lawley & Son, Neponset, Massachusetts. Later renamed Orca, she was commissioned into the U.S. Navy for World War I service on 8 May 1917 with Boatswain F. D. Grassie in command and was formally purchased by the United States Government from S. W. Colten of Bryn Mawr, Pennsylvania, on 17 May 1917.

Operating in the 1st Naval District, headquartered at Boston, Massachusetts, during World War I, Orca patrolled in and around Boston throughout her naval career.

She was moored to Fishe Wharf, Boston, from October to December 1918. In December, she steamed to Quincy, Massachusetts, where she decommissioned on 30 December 1918.

Orca was struck from the Naval Register and ordered sold on 18 August 1919. She was sold to Frazer Brace and Company of New York City on 2 February 1920.

References

Department of the Navy: Naval Historical Center: Online Library of Selected Images: Civilian Ships: Orca (American Steam Yacht, 1901). Previously named Monaloa. Served as USS Orca (SP-726) in 1917-1920

Patrol vessels of the United States
World War I patrol vessels of the United States
Steam yachts
Ships built in Quincy, Massachusetts
1901 ships